2011-12 Moldovan Cup is the 21st season of the Moldovan annual football tournament. The competition began on 14 September 2011 with the First Preliminary Round and will end with the final held in May 2012. The winner of the competition will qualify for the second qualifying round of the 2012–13 UEFA Europa League.

First Preliminary Round
Entering this round are 30 clubs from the Moldovan "B" Division. These matches took place on 14 September 2011.

|}

Second Preliminary Round
The 15 winners from the previous round and 1 club from the Moldovan "B" Division entered this stage of the competition. These matches took place on 28 September 2011.

|}

First round
In this round enter teams from "A" Division. They will play against 8 winner teams from the second preliminary round. These matches took place on 12 October 2011.

|}

Second round
In this round enter 4 teams from National Division. These matches were played on 25 and 26 October 2011.

Third round
In this round entered the five winners from the previous round, the three lucky winners from first round and the remaining eight teams from the National Division. These matches were played on 24 November 2011.

|}

Quarterfinals
This round featured the eight winners from the previous round. The matches are to be played on 10 April 2012.

|}

Semifinals
This round featured the four winners from the previous round. The matches are to be played on 14 May 2012.

|}

Final
The match was scheduled to be played at 27 May 2012.

Top goalscorers
Updated to matches played on 19 May 2013.

References

Moldovan Cup seasons
Moldovan Cup 2011-12
Moldova